Gerti Shima (born 9 May 1986 in Tirana) is an Albanian professional basketball player who currently plays for Albanian side KB Tirana in the Albanian Basketball Superliga. Shima transferred for the second time to Sigal Prishtina in January 2016. He made a big comeback to his hometown club, where he has been playing professionally since he was 15 years old, KB Tirana on 3 November 2016.He retired from basketball in September 2021,after he was elected in position of Secretary General in Albania National Olympic Committee.
In 2006 he scored 91 points in a game with Valbona against Partizani, a league record that stood for ten years until Genti Lasku scored 100.

Career
Shima returned to Kosovo in September 2012 after securing a transfer to KB Peja, signing a one-year contract.

On 10 August 2015, Shima signed one-year contract for KB Bashkimi., but on 8 January 2016 he left KB Bashkimi.

On 11 January 2016, he signed one-year contract for Sigal Prishtina. 
On 3 November 2016, he made a come back to SK.Tirana.
Shima played from 2001 in the national team and he is also the Capitan of Albania national team.

From September 2021 he is in position of Secretary General at Albania Olympic Committee

Achievements
Albanian A-1 League: 9
BC Valbona: 2004-05, 2005-06
PBC Tirana:2002-03  2007-08 ,2008-09, 2009-10, 2010-11 2016-2017 ,2017-18
Kosova league 2
Siguria Superleague
KB Peja: 2012-2013 
Sigal Prishtina: 2015-2016 
Basketball Cup: 8
PBC Tirana: 2001-2002 2008-09, 2009-10, 2010-11 2016-17
BC Valbona 2004-05,2005–06
Kosova Cup 2015-2016 (Sigal Prishtina)
Albanian Basketball Supercup: 7
PBC Tirana:2008  2009, 2010, 2011 2017
BC Valbona 2004-05, 2005–06
Balkan league : 1   2015-2016 (Sigal Prishtina)

References

External links

https://cijm.org.gr/gerti-shima-appointed-general-secretary-of-the-albanian-olympic-committee/

https://www.insidethegames.biz/articles/1113231/shima-new-koksh-secretary-general

Balkan League Profile
Real GM Profile
Eurobasket Profile
EuroBasket Profile

1986 births
Living people
Albanian men's basketball players
Power forwards (basketball)
KB Peja players
Bashkimi Prizren players
KB Prishtina players
Basketball players from Tirana